Harmony Township is the name of several locations in the U.S. state of Pennsylvania:
Harmony Township, Beaver County, Pennsylvania
Harmony Township, Forest County, Pennsylvania
Harmony Township, Susquehanna County, Pennsylvania

(See also the borough Harmony, Pennsylvania.)

Pennsylvania township disambiguation pages